K. K. Desai was a Judge who served as 17th Chief Justice of Bombay High Court.

Personal life 
He was born in Bombay on 27 October 1910 and studied in Gurukul Residential School, Bharuch and got Degree of LLB from Government Law College of Bombay.

References 

Judges of the Bombay High Court
1910 births
Year of death missing